Come Together is an EP by Killing Floor, released on February 10, 1998 by Re-Constriction Records.

Reception
Aiding & Abetting called Come Together "a remix set that is worth the cash" and "these reworkings do make solid and creative improvements on the originals." Larry Miles of Black Monday considered the release better than Killing Floor's second album, saying "lots o' guitar and madness abound create a single that is better than the full-length album and "If danceable, crunchy music is what your looking for, then Come Together is the single your in need of." Fabryka Music Magazine gave the album a mixed review of two out of four stars but credited the band for fitting comfortably within the Re-Constriction Records roster. Sonic Boom called the album "quite a radically different collection of remixes, each utilizing little original source material, making for quite a diverse selection of music."

Track listing

Personnel
Adapted from the Come Together liner notes.

Killing Floor
 James Basore – instruments
 John Belew – instruments
 Marc Phillips – instruments
 Karl Tellefsen – instruments
 Christian Void – instruments

Release history

References

External links 
 Come Together at Discogs (list of releases)

1998 EPs
Killing Floor (American band) albums
Re-Constriction Records EPs